David George Crighton, FRS (15 November 1942 – 12 April 2000) was a British mathematician and physicist.

Life
Crighton was born in Llandudno, North Wales, where his mother, Violet Grace Garrison, had been sent because of the bombing of London during the Second World War. He did not become interested in mathematics until his last two years at Watford Grammar School for Boys. He entered St John's College, Cambridge, in 1961 and started lecturing at Woolwich Polytechnic (today University of Greenwich) in 1964, having completed only his bachelor's degree.

A few years later he met John Ffowcs Williams and started to work for him at Imperial College London, while simultaneously studying for his doctorate (awarded in 1969) at the same place. In 1974, he was appointed as a research fellow in the Department of Engineering at the University of Cambridge. However, he never took up this post, but instead accepted the chair in applied mathematics at the University of Leeds, which he held until 1986.

He then returned to Cambridge as Professor of Applied Mathematics in succession to George Batchelor.

Later, he became a well-loved Master of Jesus College (1997–2000), and was head of the Applied Mathematics and Theoretical Physics Department (DAMTP) in Cambridge between 1991 and 2000, where he was held in huge regard by the faculty and students.

Away from his mathematical work, Crighton was a devotee of the music of Richard Wagner, as well as music for the piano.

Work

Crighton's scientific interests were primarily in the theory of waves and aeroacoustics, as well as in some areas of fluid mechanics. He published over 120 papers and one book.

In his first paper, Crighton studied the sound wave associated with turbulent flow over a discontinuous surface formed by two semi-infinite flexible planes. Over the years, he worked broadly in the fields of acoustics, equation theory and quasi-diabatic systems including solitons. This included works on the generalised Burgers' equation and inverse scattering theory.
 
The distinction of his work was recognised by the award of the Rayleigh Medal of the Institute of Acoustics, the Per Bruel Gold Medal of the American Society of Mechanical Engineers and the Otto Laporte Award of the American Physical Society.

David Crighton Medal

The Institute of Mathematics and its Applications and the London Mathematical Society instituted the David Crighton Medal in 2002 in honour of Crighton. The award is made biennially, and was first presented in 2003. Holders of the medal include Frank Kelly, Peter Neumann, Keith Moffatt, Christopher Zeeman, John Ball and David Abrahams.

References

1942 births
2000 deaths
People from Llandudno
Academics of Imperial College London
Academics of the University of Greenwich
Academics of the University of Leeds
People educated at Watford Grammar School for Boys
Alumni of St John's College, Cambridge
Fellows of Jesus College, Cambridge
Masters of Jesus College, Cambridge
Fellows of St John's College, Cambridge
Fellows of the Royal Society
Cambridge mathematicians
Fluid dynamicists
20th-century English mathematicians
Journal of Fluid Mechanics editors